Transua is a town in the far east of Ivory Coast. It is a sub-prefecture of and the seat of Transua Department in Gontougo Region, Zanzan District. Transua is also a commune.

In 2014, the population of the sub-prefecture of Transua was 36,200.

Villages
The thirty two villages of the sub-prefecture of Transua and their population in 2014 are:

Notes

Sub-prefectures of Gontougo
Communes of Gontougo